Kim Chang-min (born September 4, 1985 in Uiseong County) is a South Korean curler. Kim was the skip of the South Korean men's team at the 2018 Winter Olympics.

Career

Juniors
Kim's curling career began quickly, with a trip to the 1998 Pacific Curling Championships in just his first year of curling. Kim played third for the Korean team, which was skipped by Song He-dong. The team was outmatched in the tournament, and they would go winless in six games.

With a few more years of experience under his belt, Kim would play on the Korean junior men's team, going to the World Junior Curling Championships in 2004, 2005 and 2006. At the 2004 World Junior Curling Championships, Kim played third for skip Kim Soo-hyuk. After a 5-4 round robin record, the team beat Canada in a tiebreaker match to make the playoffs. There, the team would lose in both the semifinal and the bronze medal final, settling for fourth place. At the 2005 World Junior Curling Championships, the team found less success, finishing the round robin with a 2-7 record, and missed the playoffs. At the 2006 World Junior Curling Championships, Kim was promoted to skip the Korean team. He led his rink of Kim Min-chan, Park Jong-duk, Park Jin-oh and Choi Byung-rok to a 4-5 record, again missing the playoffs.

During his junior career, Kim won a gold medal at the 2005 Pacific Junior Curling Championships, a silver medal in 2007 and a bronze medal in 2006.

Kim has played in four Winter Universiades for the Korean team, while attending Andong National University. Kim skipped the team in all four of his appearances. He won the gold medal at the 2011 Winter Universiade with teammates Kim Min-chan, Seong Se-hyeon, Seo Young-seon and Oh Eun-su. He would lead Korea to a fourth-place finish at the 2009 Winter Universiade, fifth place at the 2007 Winter Universiade and 8th place at the 2013 Winter Universiade.

Men's
After a premature trip in 1998, Kim returned to the Pacific Curling Championships in 2009. Kim skipped the Korean team of Kim Min-chan, Lim Myung-sup, Jeong Tac-yeon and Seong Se-hyeon to a bronze medal. Kim returned to the event in 2011, which was renamed to the Pacific-Asia Championships. He skipped the Korean team of Kim Min-chan, Seong Se-hyeon, Seo Young-seon and Oh Eun-su to another bronze medal. Kim also skipped the Korean team at the 2012 Pacific-Asia Curling Championships. He would be less successful there, as his team would finish in 4th place.

On the World Curling Tour, Kim won two events early in his career, the 2013 Original 16 WCT Bonspiel and the 2016 KKP Classic.

Kim and his rink of Seong, Oh, and Lee Ki-bok were named as South Korea's Olympic team for the 2018 Winter Olympics. In their Olympic season, the team won the 2017 Pacific-Asia Curling Championships and were the runners-up in their first career Grand Slam of Curling event, the 2017 Boost National. They became the first Asian based team to make it to a men's Grand Slam final.

Kim and his rink won the Korean National Championship in July 2019. To begin the 2019-20 season, Kim and his team of Lee Ki-jeong, Kim Hak-kyun and Lee Ki-bok finished runner-up at the 2019 Cameron's Brewing Oakville Fall Classic. Kim skipped the South Korean national men's team to a gold medal at the 2019 Pacific-Asia Curling Championships following a perfect 11-0 record through the tournament. That season, the team also won the 2019 China Open on the tour. The team was supposed to represent South Korea at the 2020 World Men's Curling Championship, but it was cancelled due to the COVID-19 pandemic.

After finishing second in 2020, Kim won the Korean national championship again in 2021, with his new teammates Kim Soo-hyuk throwing last rocks, Jeon Jae-ik throwing second, and Kim Hak-gyun playing lead. On the Tour, they won the Avonair event of the Alberta Curling Series and the Kamloops Crown of Curling, and played in the season ending Champions Cup Grand Slam event, where they failed to qualify for the playoffs. He led the Korean team to a 5–1 round robin record at the 2021 Pacific-Asia Curling Championships, and won both their playoff games to claim the gold medal. A month later, the team faltered at the Olympic Qualification event, missing the playoffs with a 2–6 record. The team represented South Korea at the 2022 World Men's Curling Championship (with Seong Se-hyeon throwing second in place if Jeon), where he led Korea to a 6–6 record. Seong remained as the team's second for the remainder of the season.

Grand Slam record

References

External links

Living people
1985 births
South Korean male curlers
People from Uiseong County
Universiade medalists in curling
Curlers at the 2018 Winter Olympics
Olympic curlers of South Korea
Pacific-Asian curling champions
Universiade gold medalists for South Korea
Competitors at the 2011 Winter Universiade
Sportspeople from North Gyeongsang Province
21st-century South Korean people